After the Fall is a play by the American dramatist Arthur Miller.

Productions
The play premiered on Broadway at the ANTA Washington Square Theatre on January 23, 1964, and closed on May 29, 1964 after 208 performances. Directed by Elia Kazan, who collaborated with Miller on the script, the cast starred Barbara Loden as Maggie and Jason Robards Jr. as Quentin, along with Ralph Meeker as Mickey, Salome Jens as Holga, and an early appearance by Faye Dunaway as Nurse.

Barbara Loden, who would become Kazan's wife in 1967, won the 1964 Tony Award for Best Featured Actress in a Play, and Jason Robards was nominated for the 1964 Tony Award for Best Actor in a Play.

In 1984, the play was revived Off-Broadway at Playhouse 91, where it ran from October 4 to December 2 that year. Directed by John Tillinger, the cast starred Frank Langella and Dianne Wiest.

In 2004, the play was revived on Broadway at the American Airlines Theatre in a Roundabout Theatre Company production from June 25 (previews) to September 12 that year. Directed by Michael Mayer, the cast starred Peter Krause and Carla Gugino. The play was nominated for the 2005 Drama Desk Award for Outstanding Set Design of a Play (Richard Hoover).

Analysis

After the Fall, one of Miller's more personal plays, is a thinly veiled personal critique centered on Miller's recent divorce from Marilyn Monroe: the plot takes place inside the mind of Quentin, a New York City Jewish intellectual who decides to reexamine his life, in order to determine whether or not he should marry his most recent love, Holga.

The play has been roundly criticised by some for being too similar to Miller's actual life because Maggie's suicide is similar to the accidental overdose death of Miller's former wife, Monroe. The feelings of the protagonist, Quentin, are often believed to be Miller's own reflections about his failed marriage.

For example, according to Sarah Bradford, in her biography America's Queen: The Life of Jacqueline Kennedy Onassis, “Jackie, who had admired Arthur Miller enough to seat him at her table at the Malraux dinner, turned on him for his betrayal of Marilyn in his play After the Fall, which opened in New York on January 23, 1964. For [Jackie Kennedy] loyalty was the ultimate test of character, and in portraying Marilyn as a self-destructive slut whom he had abandoned for her own good, Miller had dismally failed it.”

Although After the Fall remains very unpopular with critics, it is revered in the academic arena as a deep and intellectual play, albeit difficult to follow because it does not follow the conventional sequence of events found in typical works.

The play remains one of Miller's less popular works, attributed in part to the non-linear, often surrealistic nature of the plot and setting; all but the initial and final seconds of the play take place in the protagonist's brain, which is reflected by a set comprising a single chair before a concentration camp guard tower, which is surrounded by a giant, winding ramp made up of crevices, pits, and abutments. The plot unfolds over a period of time, and due to the non-linear nature of the story, characters and occurrences appear as the protagonist remembers them. Reflecting the nature of the mind, they often disappear and their stories remain unresolved until later in the play, when they spontaneously reappear again.

Frank Rich noted: "Quentin is a witness to alarming public and personal catastrophes: the stock market crash, the Holocaust, the McCarthy witchhunts and the self-destruction of a show business idol to whom he is married."

Television
A television production of the play was shown in December 1974 on NBC. It starred Faye Dunaway, Christopher Plummer, Bibi Andersson, and a young Brooke Shields, and was directed by Gilbert Cates. Arthur Miller wrote the teleplay based upon his original stage play.

References

External links

 

1964 plays
Plays by Arthur Miller